The 14th government of Turkey (9 March 1943 – 7 August 1946) was a government in the history of Turkey. It is also called second Saracoğlu government.

Background 
The government was formed after the general elections held on 28 February 1943. Şükrü Saracoğlu of Republican People's Party (CHP), who was also the prime minister of the previous government, was appointed as the prime minister.

The government
In the list below, the cabinet members who served only a part of the cabinet's lifespan are shown in the column "Notes".

Aftermath
The government ended after the general elections held on 21 July 1946. Although his party won the elections, Saracoğlu retired from active politics due to health problems.

References

Cabinets of Turkey
Republican People's Party (Turkey) politicians
1943 establishments in Turkey
1946 disestablishments in Turkey
Cabinets established in 1943
Cabinets disestablished in 1946
Members of the 14th government of Turkey
7th parliament of Turkey
Republican People's Party (Turkey)